Dennis Marsden (1933–2009) was a British sociologist based at the University of Essex.  He was the co-author (with Brian Jackson) of Education and the Working Class (1961), and the author of Mothers Alone: Poverty and the Fatherless Family (1969).

References

External links
 Dennis Marsden at "Pioneers of Qualitative Research" from the Economic and Social Data Service

1933 births
2009 deaths
Alumni of St Catharine's College, Cambridge
British sociologists